Yue Hong (born 13 August 1962) is a Chinese actress.

She is noted for her roles as Gui Lan and Da Lian in the films Wild Mountains and A Tale of Two Donkeys respectively.

Early life
Yue was born and raised in Chengdu, Sichuan. After Resumption of University Entrance Examination in 1977, she entered Central Academy of Drama in 1980, majoring in acting, where she graduated in 1984.

Acting career
After graduation, Yue was assigned to August First Studio as an actress.

Yue had her first experience in front of the camera in 1984, and she was chosen to act as a support actor in The Isle.

Yue first rose to prominence in 1985 for performing sketch in the CCTV New Years Gala. It reached number one in the ratings when it aired in China.

Yue won the Best Actress Award at the 6th Golden Rooster Awards for her performance in Wild Mountains, and she won the Golden Phoenix Award.

For her role as Yang Guizhen in Eight Women Die a Martyr (1987), Yue won the Xiaobaihua Award for Best Supporting Actress.

In 2009, Yue played in Li Dawei's film A Tale of Two Donkeys, for which she won the Best Supporting Actress Award at the 27th Golden Rooster Awards, and the Most Popular Actress Award at the 12th Shanghai International Film Festival. That same year, she appeared in Shaken World, which earned her a Best Actress Award at the 6th Guangzhou University Student Film Festival.

Personal life
Yue and her husband divorced in 1990，they have a daughter, Kaola.

In 2002, Yue was diagnosed with stomach cancer, she was perfectly recovered from her illness in 2005.

Filmography

Film

Television

Awards

References

1962 births
Actresses from Chengdu
Living people
Central Academy of Drama alumni
Chinese film actresses
Chinese television actresses
20th-century Chinese actresses
21st-century Chinese actresses